Gösta Westerlund (5 February 1936 – 1985) was a Swedish ice hockey player. Westerlund was part of the Djurgården Swedish champions' team of 1963.

References

Swedish ice hockey players
Djurgårdens IF Hockey players
1936 births
1985 deaths